Peter Michael Jackson (14 October 1928 – 19 February 2020) was a British Labour Party politician.

Jackson was born in Sheffield in October 1928, and was educated at a Sheffield Grammar School, Durham University and University College, Leicester. He was married to Christine Thomas from 1961 to 1979.

At the 1966 general election, he was elected as the Member of Parliament for the High Peak constituency in Derbyshire, ending nearly 56 years of Conservative dominance and was the first ever Labour Party MP for the seat. Jackson sat in the House of Commons for only four years, and lost his seat at the 1970 general election, to the Conservative Spencer Le Marchant.  He was the enthusiastic secretary of the Humanist Parliamentary Group from 1967 to 1970.

Jackson was interviewed in 2012 as part of The History of Parliament's oral history project.

He died in February 2020 at the age of 91.

References

External links 
 
Peter Jackson interview with the History of Parliament oral history project

1928 births
2020 deaths
High Peak, Derbyshire
Labour Party (UK) MPs for English constituencies
Members of the Parliament of the United Kingdom for constituencies in Derbyshire
UK MPs 1966–1970
Alumni of Durham University
Alumni of the University of Leicester
People educated at Sheffield Grammar School